Biomphalaria tchadiensis is a species of air-breathing freshwater snail, an aquatic pulmonate gastropod mollusk in the family Planorbidae, the ram's horn snails.

This species is endemic to lake Chad in Cameroon, Chad and in Nigeria.

This species has been considered Vulnerable in 1996.

References

Invertebrates of Chad
Biomphalaria
Freshwater snails
Gastropods described in 1904
Taxonomy articles created by Polbot